Anthony Herbert (born 18 April 1998) is a Trinidadian professional footballer currently playing as a defender for Haka.

Club career
In February 2022, it was announced that Herbert had signed a professional contract with Finnish side Haka. He signed a contract extension in November of the same year.

International career
In September 2022, Herbert received his first call up to the Trinidad and Tobago national football team.

Career statistics

Club

Notes

International

References

External links
 
 Anthony Herbert at the Fairleigh Dickinson University
 Anthony Herbert at the St. John's University

1998 births
Living people
Sportspeople from Brooklyn
Soccer players from New York City
Fairleigh Dickinson University alumni
St. John's University (New York City) alumni
American sportspeople of Trinidad and Tobago descent
American soccer players
Trinidad and Tobago footballers
Trinidad and Tobago youth international footballers
Trinidad and Tobago international footballers
Association football defenders
Veikkausliiga players
New York Red Bulls players
Fairleigh Dickinson Knights men's soccer players
St. John's Red Storm men's soccer players
FC Haka players
Trinidad and Tobago expatriate footballers
Trinidad and Tobago expatriate sportspeople in Finland
Expatriate footballers in Finland